Ángel Rosado García is a professional wrestler from Puerto Rico better known by his ring name BJ.

Championships and accomplishments
World Wrestling Council
WWC Universal Heavyweight Championship (3 times)
WWC Puerto Rico Championship (3 times)
WWC Television Championship (2 times)
WWC World Tag Team Championship (3 times) – with Chicano (2) and Joe Bravo (1)
WWC World Junior Heavyweight Championship (2 times)
World Wrestling League
WWL World Heavyweight Championship (1 time)
WWL Americas Championship (1 time)

References

Puerto Rican male professional wrestlers
Living people
Year of birth missing (living people)
21st-century professional wrestlers
WWC Universal Heavyweight Champions
WWC Puerto Rico Champions
WWC Television Champions